A partial solar eclipse occurred on January 14, 1964. A solar eclipse occurs when the Moon passes between Earth and the Sun, thereby totally or partly obscuring the image of the Sun for a viewer on Earth. Partial solar eclipses occur in the polar regions of the Earth when the center of the Moon's shadow misses the Earth.

Related eclipses

Solar eclipses of 1961–1964

Saros 150 
It is a part of Saros cycle 150, repeating every 18 years, 11 days, containing 71 events. The series started with partial solar eclipse on August 24, 1729. It contains annular eclipses from April 22, 2126 through June 22, 2829. There are no total eclipses in this series. The series ends at member 71 as a partial eclipse on September 29, 2991. The longest duration of annularity will be 9 minutes, 58 seconds on December 19, 2522.
<noinclude>

References

External links 

1964 01 14
1964 in science
1964 01 14
January 1964 events